Memphis Beat is the sixth album by Jerry Lee Lewis released on the Smash label in 1966.

Recording
More than half the songs on Memphis Beat were recorded on January 5 and 6, 1966 at Phillips Studio in Memphis. The remaining selections were taken from a rare New York City session eight months earlier and Lewis's earliest sessions at Smash in 1963. The album includes a rare Lewis original called "Lincoln Limousine," a garbled tribute to John F. Kennedy. In his book Jerry Lee Lewis: Lost and Found, Joe Bonomo calls the track "simply weird, so ambiguous and amateurishly written that it's impossible to determine exactly what motivated him to write it."  The album also includes "Too Young," a piano lounge number that Bonomo deems "a real laugher" and "hysterically uncomfortable."  Lewis fares better on "Wine Spo-Dee-O-Dee" and the George Jones classic "She Thinks I Still Care," but the collection contained no new hits.

Reception
After Memphis Beat was released in May 1966, it stalled at 145 on the Billboard albums chart despite solid promotion from Smash and decent reviews.  Lewis's commercial slump would continue until 1968, when he finally broke on the country charts with "Another Place, Another Time."  In 2014 Lewis biographer Rick Bragg wrote, "Throughout the mid-1960s he cut one album after another of other people's music...But none of it was new, not really."  Bruce Eder of AllMusic praises the album: "After veering hard into country (and country-pop) territory with Country Songs for City Folks, Jerry Lee Lewis came roaring back with Memphis Beat in 1966, featuring his hardest rocking sounds in years, and a band who were as good as any with whom he'd ever recorded."

Track listing

1966 albums
Jerry Lee Lewis albums
albums produced by Shelby Singleton